Gigamon is a privately held network visibility and traffic monitoring technology vendor. Formerly traded publicly, it is now owned by Elliott Management. Headquartered in Santa Clara,  California, Gigamon had 371 employees as of December 27, 2014, and 743 employees as of April 2017.

The company's proprietary products can manipulate and route traffic to various application performance, network management, analysis, compliance, and security tools.

History
Gigamon was founded in 2004 as Gigamon Systems, LLC.

The company went public on the New York Stock Exchange on June 11, 2013. During the initial public offering on June 12, 2013, investors bought 6.75 million shares priced at $19 each, generating $128 million in sales. Gigamon officials rang the closing bell of the New York Stock Exchange on February 24, 2016.

In January 2018, the company was acquired by Elliott Management Corporation and The Qatar Investment Authority (QIA) for US$1.6 billion.

Products
Gigamon develops physical and virtual network visibility technologies, including network TAP and aggregation products, traffic manipulation applications, and visibility fabric nodes.

Lawsuits
On Friday, April 23, 2021, a federal jury of the US District Court and Eastern District of Texas delivered its verdict regarding Gigamon’s claims of APCON Inc.’s infringement on certain specified network technology patents. Gigamon’s infringement assertions were denied when the jury unanimously ruled that not only were allegations of APCON’s infringement invalid, but all claims related to five network data management patents at issue were invalid as well.

References

External links
 

Companies based in Santa Clara, California
Companies formerly listed on the New York Stock Exchange
Computer security companies
Network management
American companies established in 2004
2004 establishments in California
2018 mergers and acquisitions
Private equity portfolio companies